Peggy Jo Tallas (June 6, 1944 – May 5, 2005) was a Texan woman who cross-dressed to rob banks as Cowboy Bob.  Her favorite movie was Butch Cassidy and the Sundance Kid and, when finally apprehended in 2005, she committed suicide by cop by engaging in a shootout while armed with a toy pistol.  Her own story is to be filmed as Peggy Jo by Phillip Noyce in which she will be played by Lily James.

Her story was theatricalized by Buntport Theater and square product theatre in their 2014 play Peggy Jo & the Desolate Nothing.

References

External links
 Peggy Jo Tallas – episode 3 of Addicted to the Life

2005 deaths
2005 suicides
American bank robbers
American female criminals
People shot dead by law enforcement officers in the United States
Suicides in Texas